The Khalistan Zindabad Force (KZF) is a militant group and is part of the Khalistan movement to create a separate country Sikh homeland called Khalistan by carving  Punjab and some parts of neighbouring states of Haryana, Rajasthan and Himachal Pradesh out of Indian union.

Organisation and activities
The Khalistan Zindabad Force is headed by Ranjit Singh Neeta, a native of Jammu and Kashmir. He was listed among India's 20 most wanted persons in 2008.

The strength and striking capabilities of the Khalistan Zindabad Force are currently unknown, but it is reported that attempts have been made for the Khalistan Zindabad Force and other militant groups from Kashmir to co-ordinate their efforts. Funding of the organisation comes from United Kingdom, Malaysia and Spain.

Attacks
Claims
and denials
of responsibility have been reported in the name of the Khalistan Zindabad Force for a May 2009 attack at the Gurdwara Ravidass in Vienna, Austria, that left Rama Nand, a leader of the Dera Sach Khand dead, 17 injured,
and sparked riots across northern India.

Status
In December 2005 the European Union classified the Khalistan Zindabad Force as a terrorist organisation, freezing its monetary assets throughout its 25 member countries.

The KZF remains banned in India and the European Union.  The Khalistan Zindabad Force was reported to still be active in 2008. In 2019, a letter purporting to be from the KZF threatened Indian agencies and the Chief Minister of Punjab.

On February 12, 2020, The special court of National Investigation Agency (NIA) India in Mohali, Punjab issued non-bailable warrants against Pakistan-based KZF chairperson Ranjeet Singh Neeta and Germany-based Gurmeet Singh Bagga.  The court issued warrants against Neeta and Bagga during an investigation related to the delivery of arms, ammunition, explosives, communication devices, and fake currency notes from the other side of the border with the help of a drone. This is the second time in the past five months that legal action was taken against Bagga. Earlier in October, Bagga was amongst the eight Khalistani operatives against whom Interpol issued a Red Corner Notice. Speaking about the verdict, NIA spokesperson said that their investigation revealed that both Neeta and Bagga were involved in the illegal transfer of arms, ammunition, explosives, and other products from across the border. He said, "Investigation has revealed that they have been able to recruit certain individuals from Punjab for carrying out terrorist activities."

On March 17, 2020, National Investigation Agency (NIA) files charge sheet against nine Khalistani terrorists for their alleged involvement in Punjab drone arms drop case. All the accused have been charged with IPC relevant provisions, Arms Act and Explosives Substances Act and Unlawful Activities (Prevention) Act.

February 2021, it is reported through official sources and internal elements of KZF that Ranjeet Singh is no longer alive. His death cause reported was heart attack during first week of February 2021. Officially neither KZF nor the Indian government has spoken about it but there are foreign and independent media news agencies that reported his death news is confirmed.

See also 

 Kharku

References

Designated terrorist organizations associated with Sikhism
Paramilitary organisations based in India
Pro-Khalistan militant outfits
National liberation movements
Organisations designated as terrorist by the European Union
Organisations designated as terrorist by India
Organizations based in Asia designated as terrorist
Sikh terrorism
Sikh terrorism in Austria
Sikh terrorism in India
1988 establishments in Punjab, India